Alniaria alnifolia (syns. Sorbus alnifolia and Aria alnifolia), also called alder-leafed whitebeam, Korean whitebeam, or Korean mountain ash, is a species of whitebeam native to eastern Asia in eastern and northern China, Taiwan, Korea and Japan.

Description 
Alniaria alnifolia is a medium-sized deciduous tree growing to 10–20 m tall with a trunk up to 30 cm diameter and grey bark; the crown is columnar or conic in young trees, becoming rounded with age, with branches angled upwards, and slender shoots. The leaves are green above, and thinly hairy with white hairs beneath, 5–10 cm long and 3–6 cm broad, simple, usually unlobed (but see varieties, below), broadest near the base, with serrated margins and an acute apex. The autumn colour is orange-pink to red. The flowers are 10–18 mm diameter, with five white petals and 20 yellowish-white stamens; they are produced in corymbs 4–8 cm diameter in late spring. The fruit is a globose pome 8–15 mm diameter, bright red, with a dimple at the apex; they are mature in mid autumn.

It has sometimes been placed in a separate genus of its own as Micromeles alnifolia, differing from other whitebeams in the deciduous sepals on the fruit (persistent in other whitebeams), but genetic evidence places it close to Sorbus aria.

Cultivation and uses
It is occasionally grown as an ornamental tree in northern Europe, primarily for its autumn colour. The cultivar 'Skyline' has been selected for its fastigiate growth.

Gallery

References

alnifolia
Trees of China
Trees of Japan
Trees of Korea
Trees of Taiwan
Plants described in 2018